Into the Blue: Family Secrets and the Search for a Great Lakes Shipwreck is a non-fiction book, written by Canadian writer Andrea Curtis, first published in April 2003 by Random House Canada. In the book, the author narrates her family history and their connection to the 1906 shipwreck of the SS J.H. Jones, lost to the late-November swells of Ontario's Georgian Bay, claiming the lives of all on board. The ship's captain, Jim Crawford, left his one-year-old daughter, Eleanor, an orphan who faced a future of poverty. Curtis did not know the stigma her grandmother endured until researching the shipwreck, and discovering its links to her families past. Staebler Award administrator Kathryn Wardropper called the book "a thoroughly credible and enjoyable book".

Awards and honours
Into the Blue received the 2004 Edna Staebler Award for Creative Non-Fiction.

See also
List of Edna Staebler Award recipients

References

External links
Andrea Curtis, Home page, Retrieved November 27, 2012

Canadian non-fiction books
2003 non-fiction books